In the 10th edition of Systema Naturae, Carl Linnaeus classified the arthropods, including insects, arachnids and crustaceans, among his class "Insecta". Insects with membranous wings, including bees, wasps and ants were brought together under the name Hymenoptera.

Cynips (gall wasps)

Cynips rosae – Diplolepis rosae
Cynips hieracii – Aulacidea hieracii 
Cynips glechomae – Liposthenes glechomae 
Cynips quercus baccarum – Neuroterus quercusbaccarum
Cynips quercus folii – Cynips quercusfolii
Cynips quercus petioli
Cynips quercus pedunculi
Cynips quercus gemmae
Cynips fagi
Cynips viminalis
Cynips salicis strobili
Cynips amerinae – Euura amerinae 
Cynips psenes – Blastophaga psenes 
Cynips sycomori – Sycophaga sycomori

Tenthredo (sawflies)

Tenthredo femorata – Cimbex femoratus
Tenthredo lutea – Cimbex luteus
Tenthredo amerinae – Pseudoclavellaria amerinae
Tenthredo lucorum – Trichiosoma lucorum
Tenthredo fasciata – Abia fasciata
Tenthredo americana – Incalia americana
Tenthredo nitens – Abia nitens
Tenthredo pini – Diprion pini
Tenthredo juniperi – Monoctenus juniperi
Tenthredo ustulata – Arge ustulata
Tenthredo rustica – Arge rustica
Tenthredo scrophulariae
Tenthredo pratensis – Dolerus pratensis
Tenthredo cerasi – Caliroa cerasi
Tenthredo salicis – Nematus salicis
Tenthredo mesomela
Tenthredo rufipes – Macrophya rufipes
Tenthredo campestris
Tenthredo atra – Tenthredella atra
Tenthredo viridis – Rhogogaster viridis
Tenthredo rosae – Athalia rosae
Tenthredo cincta – Allantus cinctus
Tenthredo livida
Tenthredo septentrionalis – Craesus septentrionalis
Tenthredo 12-punctata – Macrophya duodecimpunctata
Tenthredo erythrocephala – Acantholyda erythrocephala
Tenthredo abietis – Cephalcia abietis
Tenthredo sylvatica – Pamphilus sylvaticus
Tenthredo nemoralis – Neurotoma nemoralis
Tenthredo cynosbati – ?
Tenthredo reticulata – Caenolyda reticulata
Tenthredo betulae – Pamphilus betulae
Tenthredo saltuum – Neurotoma saltuum
Tenthredo intercus – ?
Tenthredo rumicis – Polynematus annulatus 
Tenthredo ulmi – Cladius ulmi
Tenthredo alni – Craesus septentrionalis
Tenthredo pruni – Pareophora pruni
Tenthredo lonicerae – Abia lonicerae
Tenthredo capreae – Nematus salicis

Ichneumon (ichneumon wasps)
Ichneumon gigas 
Ichneumon spectrum – Xeris spectrum
Ichneumon juvencus – Sirex juvencus
Ichneumon camelus
Ichneumon ugillatorius 
Ichneumon raptorius – Diphyus raptorius
Ichneumon sarcitorius – Ichneumon sarcitorius
Ichneumon extensorius 
Ichneumon culpatorius – Probolus culpatorius
Ichneumon constrictorius 
Ichneumon saturatorius – Vulgichneumon saturatorius
Ichneumon crispatorius – Eutanyacra crispatorius
Ichneumon pisorius
Ichneumon luctatorius – Diphyus luctatorius
Ichneumon volutatorius – Banchus volutatorius
Ichneumon vaginatorius 
Ichneumon persvasorius – Rhyssa persuasoria
Ichneumon designatorius 
Ichneumon edictorius – Ctenichneumon edictorius
Ichneumon deliratorius – Coelichneumon deliratorius
Ichneumon fossorius
Ichneumon ariolator 
Ichneumon comitator – Coelichneumon comitator
Ichneumon peregrinator – Barichneumon peregrinator
Ichneumon incubitor – Gambrus incubitor
Ichneumon reluctator – Echthrus reluctator
Ichneumon denigrator 
Ichneumon desertor
Ichneumon coruscator – Cratichneumon coruscator
Ichneumon manifestator – Ephialtes manifestator
Ichneumon compunctor – Apechthis compunctor
Ichneumon delusor – Syntactus delusor
Ichneumon venator 
Ichneumon extensor 
Ichneumon exarator 
Ichneumon turionellae – Pimpla turionellae
Ichneumon strobilellae
Ichneumon moderator 
Ichneumon resinellae 
Ichneumon praerogator 
Ichneumon mandator – Agrothereutes mandator
Ichneumon titillator – Meringopus titillator
Ichneumon enervator 
Ichneumon gravidator 
Ichneumon inculcator – Itamoplex inculcator
Ichneumon pugillator – Dusona pugillator
Ichneumon ruspator 
Ichneumon jaculator 
Ichneumon assectator 
Ichneumon appendigaster 
Ichneumon luteus – Ophion luteus
Ichneumon ramidulus – Enicospilus ramidulus
Ichneumon glaucopterus – Opheltes glaucopterus
Ichneumon circumflexus – Therion circumfiexum
Ichneumon cinctus – Gelis cinctus
Ichneumon muscarum 
Ichneumon bedeguaris 
Ichneumon juniperi 
Ichneumon puparum 
Ichneumon larvarum
Ichneumon cyniphidis 
Ichneumon coccorum 
Ichneumon secalis 
Ichneumon subcutaneus 
Ichneumon aphidum 
Ichneumon ovulorum 
Ichneumon globatus 
Ichneumon glomeratus 
Ichneumon pectinicornis

Sphex (digger wasps)

Sphex argillacea – Zeta argillaceum
Sphex sabulosa – Ammophila sabulosa
Sphex asiatica – Sceliphron asiaticum
Sphex fervens 
Sphex inda 
Sphex clavipes 
Sphex spirifex & Sphex aegyptia – Sceliphron spirifex
Sphex figulus 
Sphex viatica 
Sphex pectinipes 
Sphex variegata 
Sphex indica 
Sphex tropica 
Sphex colon 
Sphex gibba 
Sphex rufipes 
Sphex arenaria
Sphex fossoria 
Sphex leucostoma 
Sphex vaga 
Sphex caerulea 
Sphex ignita 
Sphex aurata 
Sphex cyanea

Vespa (hornets & wasps)
Vespa crabro – European hornet
Vespa vulgaris – Vespula vulgaris, common wasp
Vespa rufa – Vespula rufa
Vespa parietum 
Vespa muraria 
Vespa cribraria 
Vespa spinipes 
Vespa rupestris 
Vespa coarctata 
Vespa arvensis 
Vespa biglumis
Vespa uniglumis 
Vespa cornuta 
Vespa signata 
Vespa canadensis 
Vespa emarginata 
Vespa calida

Apis (bees)

Apis longicornis 
Apis tumulorum 
Apis clavicornis 
Apis centuncularis 
Apis cineraria 
Apis surinamensis – Eufriesea surinamensis
Apis retusa 
Apis rufa 
Apis bicornis 
Apis truncorum 
Apis dentata – Exaerete dentata
Apis cordata – Euglossa cordata
Apis helvola 
Apis succincta 
Apis zonata 
Apis caerulescens 
Apis mellifera – Western honey bee
Apis subterranea 
Apis variegata 
Apis rostrata 
Apis manicata 
Apis quadridentata 
Apis florisomuis 
Apis conica 
Apis annulata 
Apis ruficornis
Apis ichneumonea 
Apis cariosa 
Apis violacea – Xylocopa violacea, violet carpenter bee
Apis terrestris – Bombus terrestris, buff-tailed bumblebee
Apis lapidaria – Bombus lapidarius, red-tailed bumblebee
Apis muscorum – Bombus muscorum, moss carder bee 
Apis hypnorum – Bombus hypnorum, new garden bumblebee
Apis acervorum  
Apis subterranea – Bombus subterraneus, short-haired bumblebee
Apis surinamensis 
Apis aestuans 
Apis tropica 
Apis alpina – Bombus alpinus

Formica (ants)

Formica herculeana – Camponotus herculeana 
Formica rufa 
Formica fusca 
Formica nigra – Lasius nigra 
Formica obsoleta 
Formica rubra – Myrmica rubra 
Formica pharaonis – Monomorium pharaonis 
Formica salomonis – Monomorium salomonis
Formica saccharivora
Formica caespitum – Tetramorium caespitum 
Formica omnivora 
Formica bidens – Dolichoderus bidens 
Formica sexdens – Atta sexdens 
Formica cephalotes – Atta cephalotes 
Formica atrata – Cephalotes atratus 
Formica haematoda – Odontomachus haematodus 
Formica foetida – Pachycondyla foetida

Mutilla (velvet ants)

Mutilla occidentalis – Dasymutilla occidentalis 
Mutilla americana – Traumatomutilla americana 
Mutilla indica
Mutilla europaea 
Mutilla barbara – Ronisia barbara
Mutilla maura – Dasylabris maura 
Mutilla acarorum – Gelis acarorum 
Mutilla formicaria – Gelis formicarius

Notes

References

Systema Naturae
 Systema Naturae, Hymenoptera